The 1977 Major League Baseball season. The American League (AL) had its third expansion as the Seattle Mariners and Toronto Blue Jays began play.  However, the National League (NL) did not expand, remaining at 12 teams compared to the AL's 14, until the Colorado Rockies and Florida Marlins joined the NL in 1993.

Standings

American League

National League

Postseason

Bracket

Awards and honors

Major Awards

Gold Glove Awards

Statistical leaders

All-Star game

Most Valuable Player: Don Sutton, NL

Feats

No-Hitters
Jim Colborn, Kansas City Royals – May 14 vs. Texas Rangers at Royals Stadium (9 IP, 6 SO, 1 BB, 1 HBP in 6–0 win)
Dennis Eckersley, Cleveland Indians – May 30 vs. California Angels at Cleveland Municipal Stadium (9 IP, 12 SO, 1 BB in 1–0 win)
Bert Blyleven, Texas Rangers – September 22 vs. California Angels at Anaheim Stadium (9 IP, 7 SO, 1 BB in 6–0 win)

Cycles
Bob Watson, Houston Astros – June 24 vs. San Francisco Giants
John Mayberry, Kansas City Royals – August 5 vs. Chicago White Sox
Jack Brohamer, Chicago White Sox – September 24 at Seattle Mariners

Career Milestones

400 Home Runs
Willie Stargell, Pittsburgh Pirates – June 29 vs. St. Louis Cardinals at Busch Stadium (2-run home run off Eric Rasmussen)

900 Stolen Bases
Lou Brock, St. Louis Cardinals – September 30 vs. New York Mets at Busch Stadium

Home Field Attendance

Notable events

January–March
January 2 – Not even a full season into owning the Atlanta Braves, Commissioner Bowie Kuhn suspends Ted Turner for tampering with the signing of Gary Matthews.
January 4 – Mary Shane is hired by the Chicago White Sox as the first woman TV play-by-play announcer.
January 19 – The Baseball Writers' Association of America elects Ernie Banks to the Hall of Fame in his first year of eligibility.
January 31 – The Special Veterans Committee selects Joe Sewell, Amos Rusie and Al López for the Hall of Fame.
February 3 – The Hall of Fame's Special Committee on the Negro Leagues picks versatile Cuban star Martín Dihigo and shortstop John Henry Lloyd for induction. The committee then dissolves, its functions being taken over by the Veterans Committee.
March 21 – Mark Fidrych, the 1976 AL Rookie of the Year, rips the cartilage in his left knee and will undergo surgery in ten days. The injury will effectively end the fabled career of The Bird.

April–June
May 14 – Journeyman Kansas City Royals pitcher Jim Colborn no-hits the Texas Rangers at Royals Stadium, striking out six, walking one, and hitting one batter in a 6–0 Royals win.  Colborn faces 28 batters, one more than the complete game minimum.
April 6 – The Seattle Mariners open their existence and their home stadium, the Kingdome, with a 7–0 loss to the California Angels.
April 7 – The Toronto Blue Jays play their first game in franchise history, in the snow, defeating the Chicago White Sox 9–5 at Exhibition Stadium.
April 15 – The Montreal Expos play their first game at Montreal's Olympic Stadium before a crowd of 57,592, as the visiting Philadelphia Phillies win 7–2.
April 24 – Canadian Ferguson Jenkins throws the first shutout ever in Exhibition Stadium, as the visiting Boston Red Sox defeat the Toronto Blue Jays 9–0.
May 11 – Atlanta Braves owner Ted Turner names himself manager, and skippers the team to a 2–1 loss to the Pittsburgh Pirates.  National League president Chub Feeney orders him to desist, and soon after, owners are banned from managing.
May 30 – Dennis Eckersley of the Cleveland Indians throws the second no-hitter of the 1977 season, striking out twelve in a 1–0 win over the California Angels at Cleveland Municipal Stadium.  A first inning walk to Tony Solaita is all that prevents Eckersley from throwing the first perfect game since 1968.  The home plate umpire for the game is Bill Deegan, who was also the home plate umpire for Jim Colburn's no-hitter roughly two weeks earlier.
June 7 – The Chicago White Sox select Harold Baines with the number one pick in the draft. White Sox owner Bill Veeck had first seen Baines play Little League ball and had followed his career. Pitcher Bill Gullickson is taken with the second pick by the Montreal Expos, and the Milwaukee Brewers take University of Minnesota infielder Paul Molitor with the third pick. Danny Ainge, a potential pro basketball player, is picked in the 15th round.
June 8 – For the fourth time in his career, Nolan Ryan strikes out 19 batters in a game, doing so against the Toronto Blue Jays.
June 15 – The New York Mets trade Tom Seaver to the Cincinnati Reds for Pat Zachry, Doug Flynn, Steve Henderson and Dan Norman. They then trade Mike Phillips to the St. Louis Cardinals for Joel Youngblood, and send Dave Kingman to the Padres for minor league pitcher Paul Siebert and Bobby Valentine, who will one day manage the Mets.
June 18 – In the sixth inning of an NBC-televised game against the Boston Red Sox at Fenway Park, New York Yankee manager Billy Martin pulls right fielder Reggie Jackson and replaces him with Paul Blair after Jackson misplays Jim Rice's fly ball for a double. As Jackson returns to the dugout, he and Martin exchange words, Martin arguing that Jackson had shown him up by "not hustling" on the play. The Yankee manager lunges at Jackson (who is 18 years younger than Martin and outweighs him by about 40 pounds), and has to be restrained by coaches Yogi Berra and Elston Howard—with the NBC cameras showing the confrontation to the entire country. The Red Sox win, 10–4.
June 24 – In a 6–5 win over the visiting San Francisco Giants, Houston Astros first baseman Bob Watson hits for the cycle.
June 27 – The San Francisco Giants' Willie McCovey smashes two home runs, one a grand slam off reliever Joe Hoerner, in the sixth inning to pace a 14–9 victory over the Cincinnati Reds. McCovey becomes the first player in major league history to twice hit two home runs in one inning (his first time was on April 12, 1973), and also becomes the all-time National League leader with 17 career grand slams. Andre Dawson, in both 1978 and 1986, will be the next player to hit two homers in the same inning.
June 29 – Willie Stargell of the Pittsburgh Pirates hits his 400th career home run when he takes St. Louis Cardinals pitcher Eric Rasmussen deep for a two-run shot in the fifth inning of a 9–1 Pirates' victory at Busch Stadium.

July–September

July 19 – In the All-Star Game at Yankee Stadium, the National League defeats the American League for the 14th time in the last 15 encounters. Don Sutton of the Los Angeles Dodgers is named MVP.
August 5 – Kansas City Royals designated hitter John Mayberry hits for the cycle in a 12–2 win over the visiting Chicago White Sox.
August 12 – For the second consecutive day, Manny Sanguillén of the Oakland Athletics foils a no-hit bid with a single hit off the Baltimore Orioles' Jim Palmer, who settles for a two-hit 6–0 victory. Yesterday's hit was off the New York Yankees' Mike Torrez, who finished with a 3–0 two-hitter.
August 27 – Toby Harrah and Bump Wills of the Texas Rangers become the first players in Major League history to hit back-to-back inside the park home runs.  They do so in a game against the New York Yankees.
August 29 – St. Louis Cardinals outfielder Lou Brock steals two bases in a 4–3 loss to the San Diego Padres. It is the 893rd career stolen base for Brock, breaking Ty Cobb's modern record.
September 9 – In the second game of a double header in Boston, the Detroit Tigers debut their new second baseman, Lou Whitaker, and their new shortstop, Alan Trammell.  They will play side by side for 19 years to establish a new Major League record for tandem play at those positions.
September 10 – Roy Howell hits two home runs, two doubles, and a single, and drives in nine runs, as Toronto beats the Yankees 19–3.
September 15 – The California Angels trade Dave Kingman to the New York Yankees for pitcher Randy Stein. Having also played with the New York Mets and San Diego Padres earlier in the season, Kingman becomes the first – and only – Major League Baseball player to play in all four divisions in one season.
September 15 – Earl Weaver pulls his Baltimore Orioles from the field at Exhibition Stadium citing "hazardous conditions" caused by a small tarp weighed down by bricks covering the bullpen mound.  This results in a forfeiture of the game to the Toronto Blue Jays.
September 22 – Texas Rangers pitcher Bert Blyleven throws the third and final no-hitter of the 1977 season, striking out seven and walking one in a 6–0 win over the California Angels at Anaheim Stadium.
September 24 – Second baseman Jack Brohamer of the Chicago White Sox becomes the third man of the season to hit for the cycle, accomplishing the feat in an 8–3 win over the Seattle Mariners at the Kingdome.
September 25 – California Angels pitcher Nolan Ryan notches his 341st strikeout of the season, the fifth highest single season total in American League history.  Ryan set the American League single-season record four years earlier when he struck out 383 batters in 1973.
September 30 – Lou Brock of the St. Louis Cardinals steals the 900th base of his career in a 7–2 win over the New York Mets at Busch Stadium, becoming just the second man in baseball history to reach the plateau.

October–December
October 7 – In Game Three of the National League Championship Series at Philadelphia's Veterans Stadium, the Los Angeles Dodgers were down 5–3 with 2 outs in the 9th inning. Pinch-hitter Vic Davalillo beats out a 2-strike drag bunt and pinch-hitter Manny Mota follows with a long double off Greg Luzinski's glove. Mota reaches third on a throw that Ted Sizemore mishandles. Davey Lopes' grounder caroms off Mike Schmidt's knee to Larry Bowa, and the shortstop's throw is ruled late although television replays and a scene from a 1977 Philadelphia Phillies highlight film showed that Lopes was out. Los Angeles pulls out a 6–5 victory over the Phillies.
October 18 – New York Yankees right fielder Reggie Jackson hits three first-pitch home runs, in consecutive at-bats, during the decisive Game 6 of the World Series, leading the crowd to serenade him with chants of "Reg-gie! Reg-gie!" after his final home run lands deep in "the black" (center field bleachers). Jackson's historic feat powers the Yankees to an 8–4 win and a four-games-to-two Series victory over the Los Angeles Dodgers. The World Series title is the Yankees' first since 1962 and their 21st overall.
November 22 – Andre Dawson of the Montreal Expos wins the National League Rookie of the Year Award by one vote over Steve Henderson of the New York Mets. Dawson hit .282 with 19 home runs and 65 RBI, while Henderson had .297, 12, 65.
December 8 – In an unusual four team, off-season trade, the Atlanta Braves sent Willie Montañez to the New York Mets. Then, the Texas Rangers sent Adrian Devine, Tommy Boggs and Eddie Miller to the Braves; Tom Grieve and a player to be named later to the Mets, and Bert Blyleven to the Pittsburgh Pirates. The Pirates sent Al Oliver and Nelson Norman to the Rangers, and the Mets sent Jon Matlack to the Rangers and John Milner to the Pirates. The Rangers later sent Ken Henderson to the Mets to complete the trade (March 15, 1978).

References

External links
1977 Major League Baseball season schedule at Baseball Reference

 
Major League Baseball seasons